Roman food may refer to:
 
 Ancient Roman cuisine
 Food and dining in the Roman Empire
 Roman cuisine